Tri Junior-Senior High School is a public high school which serves the communities of Spiceland, Straughn, Lewisville, New Lisbon and Dunreith in Indiana.

About
Tri Junior-Senior High School is serviced by the South Henry School Corporation. The school was founded in 1968, after the closure of Spiceland, Straughn and Lewisville High Schools (New Lisbon had merged into Straughn in 1957), it sits north of Lewisville on State Route 103.

Athletics
Tri is a member of the Tri-Eastern Conference (TEC) since the 1988-89 year and abides by the rules of the IHSAA.  Before joining the TEC, Tri was a member of the Big Blue River Conference from the school's opening to the conference's closure.

See also
 List of high schools in Indiana

References

External links

Consolidation History
IHSAA profile
US News Link

Public high schools in Indiana
Schools in Henry County, Indiana